Tuin is a village in the municipality of Kičevo, North Macedonia. It used to be part of the former municipality of Oslomej.

Demographics
As of the 2021 census, Tuin had 784 residents with the following ethnic composition:
Albanians 766
Persons for whom data are taken from administrative sources 15
Macedonians 3

According to the 2002 census, the village had a total of 1,476 inhabitants. Ethnic groups in the village include:
Albanians 1,465
Macedonians 8
Others 3

References

External links

Villages in Kičevo Municipality
Albanian communities in North Macedonia